Oscar F. Minch (November 16, 1868 – September 12, 1953) was a member of the Wisconsin State Assembly.

Biography
Minch was born on November 16, 1868 in Paoli, Wisconsin. He attended high school in Madison, Wisconsin before graduation from what is now the University of Wisconsin-Madison in 1893. Minch earned a living by making baked goods and other confectioneries in Madison before returning to Paoli. He and his family operated the Paoli Mills, now listed on the National Register of Historic Places.

Minch was married to Bertha L. Watt (1875–1918) and Rosalie A. O'Brien (1875–1953). He died in 1953 in Coeur d'Alene, Idaho and was buried in Spokane, Washington.

Political career
Minch was elected to the Assembly from the 3rd District of Dane County, Wisconsin in 1896 and 1898. He was a Democrat.

References

External links

Politicians from Madison, Wisconsin
American bakers
Millers
University of Wisconsin–Madison alumni
1868 births
1953 deaths
Burials in Washington (state)
People from Montrose, Wisconsin
Democratic Party members of the Wisconsin State Assembly